Arsenic trisulfide is the inorganic compound with the formula . It is a dark yellow solid that is insoluble in water. It also occurs as the mineral orpiment (Latin: auripigmentum), which has been used as a pigment called King's yellow. It is produced in the analysis of arsenic compounds. It is a group V/VI, intrinsic p-type semiconductor and exhibits photo-induced phase-change properties.

Structure 
 occurs both in crystalline and amorphous forms. Both forms feature polymeric structures consisting of trigonal pyramidal As(III) centres linked by sulfide centres. The sulfide centres are two-fold coordinated to two arsenic atoms. In the crystalline form, the compound adopts a ruffled sheet structure. The bonding between the sheets consists of van der Waals forces. The crystalline form is usually found in geological samples. Amorphous  does not possess a layered structure but is more highly cross-linked. Like other glasses, there is no medium or long-range order, but the first co-ordination sphere is well defined.  is a good glass former and exhibits a wide glass-forming region in its phase diagram.

Properties
It is a semiconductor, with a direct band gap of 2.7 eV. The wide band gap makes it transparent to infrared light between 620 nm and 11 µm.

Synthesis

From the elements 
Amorphous  is obtained via the fusion of the elements at 390 °C. Rapid cooling of the reaction melt gives a glass. The reaction can be represented with the chemical equation:

Aqueous precipitation 

Reactions
When a film of this material is exposed to an external energy source such as thermal energy (via thermal annealing ), electromagnetic radiation (i.e. UV lamps, lasers, electron beams)), As4S6 polymerizes:

 characteristically dissolves upon treatment with aqueous solutions containing sulfide ions. The dissolved arsenic species is the pyramidal trithioarsenite anion :

 is the anhydride of the hypothetical trithioarsenous acid, . Upon treatment with polysulfide ions,  dissolves to give a variety of species containing both S–S and As–S bonds.

"Roasting"  in air gives volatile, toxic derivatives, this conversion being one of the hazards associated with the refining of heavy metal ores:

Contemporary uses

As an inorganic photoresist 
Due to its high refractive index of 2.45 and its large Knoop hardness compared to organic photoresists,  has been investigated for the fabrication of photonic crystals with a full-photonic band-gap. Advances in laser patterning techniques such as three-dimensional direct laser writing (3-D DLW) and chemical wet-etching chemistry, has allowed this material to be used as a photoresist to fabricate 3-D nanostructures.

 has been investigated for use as a high resolution photoresist material since the early 1970s, using aqueous etchants. Although these aqueous etchants allowed for low-aspect ratio 2-D structures to be fabricated, they do not allow for the etching of high aspect ratio structures with 3-D periodicity. Certain organic reagents, used in organic solvents, permit the high-etch selectivity required to produce high-aspect ratio structures with 3-D periodicity.

Medical applications 
 and  have been investigated as treatments for acute promyelocytic leukemia (APL).

For IR-transmitting glasses 
Arsenic trisulfide manufactured into amorphous form is used as a chalcogenide glass for infrared optics. It is transparent for light between wavelengths of 620 nm and 11 µm. The arsenic trisulfide glass is more resistant to oxidation than crystalline arsenic trisulfide, which minimizes toxicity concerns. It can be also used as an acousto-optic material.

Arsenic trisulfide was used for the distinctive eight-sided conical nose over the infra-red seeker of the de Havilland Firestreak missile.

Role in ancient artistry 

The ancient Egyptians reportedly used orpiment, natural or synthetic, as a pigment in artistry and cosmetics.

Miscellaneous 
Arsenic trisulfide is also used as a tanning agent. It was formerly used with indigo dye for the production of pencil blue, which allowed dark blue hues to be added to fabric via pencil or brush.

Precipitation of arsenic trisulfide is used as an analytical test for presence of dissimilatory arsenic-reducing bacteria (DARB).

Safety 

 is so insoluble that its toxicity is low. Aged samples can contain substantial amounts of arsenic oxides, which are soluble and therefore highly toxic.

Natural occurrence 
Orpiment is found in volcanic environments, often together with other arsenic sulfides, mainly realgar. It is sometimes found in low-temperature hydrothermal veins, together with some other sulfide and sulfosalt minerals.

References

Further reading
.
"Arsenic Compounds, Inorganic", Report on Carcinogens, Eleventh Edition (PDF), U.S. Department of Health and Human Services, Public Health Service, National Toxicology Program, 2005.

External links
UK Poison Information Document

WHO Food Additives Series 24
JECFA Evaluation: Arsenic
Arsenic trisulfide

Arsenic(III) compounds
Sulfides
Optical materials
Non-oxide glasses